Unhealthy Opera is the fourth full-length studio album by the French death metal band Yyrkoon. The symbol on the cover is the yellow sign from the book The King in Yellow.

Track listing
All songs written and arranged by Yyrkoon (2006 Les Editions Hurlantes/Fairplay).
 "Something Breathes" – 0:21
 "Unhealthy Opera" – 3:44
 "From the Depths" – 4:28
 "Avatar Ceremony" – 4:10
 "Temple of Infinity" – 2:34
 "Abnormal Intrusion" – 4:20
 "Screaming Shores" – 4:02
 "The Book" – 3:23
 "Horror from the Sea" – 3:36
 "Lair…" – 1:07
 "…Of Madness" – 4:38
 "Injecting Dementia" – 5:57
 "Signs" – 6:08 (bonus track)

Personnel
Stephane Souteyrand: Vocals, Lead & Rhythm Guitars
Geoffrey Gautier: Lead & Rhythm Guitars
Victorien Vilchez: Bass, Acoustic Guitars
Laurent Harrouart: Drums, Percussion
With Andy Larocque: Guest Lead Guitar on track 9

Production
Recorded, Produced, Engineered, Mixed & Mastered By Jacob Hansen

References

External links
"Unhealthy Opera" at discogs: link

Yyrkoon (band) albums
2006 albums
Osmose Productions albums
Albums produced by Jacob Hansen